Ixonanthes chinensis is a species of plant in the Ixonanthaceae family. It is found in China and Vietnam. It is threatened by habitat loss. It is a broadleaf evergreen.

References

Ixonanthaceae
Vulnerable plants
Taxonomy articles created by Polbot